David Daniel Carstens (September 1914, in Strand – 6 August 1955) was a South African boxer who competed in the Olympic games in 1932. He won the gold medal in the light heavyweight competition in Los Angeles, beating Gino Rossi of Italy in the final match.

1932 Olympic record
Below is the record of David Carstens who competed for South Africa as a light heavyweight boxer at the 1932 Los Angeles Olympics:

 Quarterfinal: defeated Hans Berger (Germany) on points
 Semifinal: defeated Peter Jorgensen (Denmark) on points
 Final: defeated Gino Rossi (Italy) on points (won gold medal)

References

1914 births
1955 deaths
People from Strand, Western Cape
Light-heavyweight boxers
Boxers at the 1932 Summer Olympics
Olympic boxers of South Africa
Olympic gold medalists for South Africa
Olympic medalists in boxing
Medalists at the 1932 Summer Olympics
South African male boxers
White South African people
Sportspeople from the Western Cape